"2 B R 0 2 B" is a science fiction short story by Kurt Vonnegut, originally published in the digest magazine If: Worlds of Science Fiction for January 1962, and collected in Vonnegut's Bagombo Snuff Box (1999). The title is pronounced "2 B R naught 2 B" and references the famous phrase "to be, or not to be" from William Shakespeare's Hamlet.

In the story, the title refers to the telephone number that one dials to schedule an assisted suicide with the Federal Bureau of Termination. Vonnegut's 1965 novel God Bless You, Mr. Rosewater describes a story by the name and attributes it to his recurring character Kilgore Trout, but the plot summary given is closer in nature to the eponymous tale from Vonnegut's short-story collection Welcome to the Monkey House.

Plot summary
The setting is a society in which aging has been cured, individuals have indefinite lifespans,  and population control is used to limit the population of the United States to forty million, a number which is maintained through a combination of infanticide and government-assisted suicide. In short, for someone to be born, someone else must first volunteer to die. As a result, births are few and far between, and deaths occur primarily by accident.

The scene is a waiting room at the Chicago Lying-In Hospital, where Edward K. Wehling Jr. is faced with the situation that his wife is about to give birth to triplets, but he has found only one person, his maternal grandfather, who will volunteer to die. A painter on a stepladder is redecorating the room with a mural depicting employees who work at the Hospital, including Dr. Benjamin Hitz, the hospital's Chief Obstetrician. Leora Duncan, from the Service Division of the Federal Bureau of Termination, arrives to pose for the mural. It is a picture of a garden that is well taken care of, and a metaphor for the United States at the time. Later, Dr. Hitz enters the scene and converses with everyone but the painter of the mural.

It becomes apparent to all that Wehling is in a state of despair since he does not want to send his grandfather and two of his children to death. Dr. Hitz questions Wehling's belief in the system and tries to make Wehling feel better by explaining how the surviving child will "live on a happy, roomy, clean, rich planet." Suddenly, Wehling draws a revolver and kills Dr. Hitz, Leora Duncan, and himself, "making room for all three children."

The painter, who is about 200 years old, is left to reflect on the scene and thinks about life, war, plague, and starvation. Descending the stepladder, he initially takes the revolver and intends to kill himself with it but is unable to do so. Instead, he calls the Bureau of Termination to make an appointment. The last line is from the receptionist at the Bureau:

Adaptations
Vonnegut's story was the basis for the 2016 Canadian short film 2BR02B: To Be or Naught to Be, directed by Marco Checa Garcia, which premiered at the Sci-Fi-London festival in April 2016.

References

External links

 
 Audio Book 2BR02B at Verkaro.org (Archive)
 
 2BR02B: To Be or Naught to Be (2016) at the Internet Movie Database

Short stories by Kurt Vonnegut
1962 short stories
Telephone numbers
Science fiction short stories
Works originally published in If (magazine)
Hospitals in fiction
Short stories adapted into films